Alfred George Fuhrman (July 20, 1896 – January 11, 1969) was an American Major League Baseball catcher. He played for the Philadelphia Athletics during the  season.

References

Major League Baseball catchers
Philadelphia Athletics players
Baseball players from Minnesota
1896 births
1969 deaths
Regina Senators players
Portland Beavers players
Evansville Evas players
Evansville Little Evas players
Peoria Tractors players
Bloomington Bloomers players
Quincy Indians players
Springfield Senators players
People from Jordan, Minnesota